Mauro Valentini (born 4 January 1964) is a retired Italian football defender.

References

1964 births
Living people
People from Viterbo
Italian footballers
Cagliari Calcio players
Atalanta B.C. players
S.S.D. Lucchese 1905 players
U.S. Viterbese 1908 players
S.P. La Fiorita players
Serie A players
Serie C players
Association football defenders
Italian expatriate footballers
Expatriate footballers in San Marino
Footballers from Lazio
Sportspeople from the Province of Viterbo